ConjuChem Biotechnologies Inc. is a medical biotechnology company located in Montreal, Quebec, Canada which is credited with inventing the experimental peptide hormone CJC-1295.

It employs 45 people, 90% of whom are in research and development.

References

External links
 

Biotechnology companies of Canada